This is a list of secondary highways in Parry Sound District, many of which provide access to isolated settlements and recreational properties within the Parry Sound District of Ontario.

Highway 510 

Secondary Highway 510, commonly referred to as Highway 510, is a provincially maintained highway in the Canadian province of Ontario.

Highway 518 

Secondary Highway 518, commonly referred to as Highway 518, is a provincially maintained secondary highway in the Canadian province of Ontario. Highway 518 spans  between Parry Sound and Kearney. It serves as one of the many links between Highway 400 and Highway 11. The highway was assumed in 1956, and has remained generally unchanged since, aside from being truncated slightly at both ends.

Highway 520 

Secondary Highway 520, commonly referred to as Highway 520, is a provincially maintained highway in the Canadian province of Ontario.

The highway links several remote First Nation hamlets to the major highway routes of the region. However, the only places of noteworthy size are the village of Magnetawan and the town of Burk's Falls.

Highway 522 

Secondary Highway 522, commonly referred to as Highway 522, is a provincially maintained highway in the Canadian province of Ontario. Highway 522 serves as the only link between these two routes south of Highway 17 and north of Highway 124. It is often used to access Grundy Lake Provincial Park, a popular camping area for northbound travellers.

Highway 522B 

Secondary Highway 522B, commonly referred to as Highway 522B, is a provincially maintained highway in the Canadian province of Ontario.
The highway was created in late 2002 when the Trout Creek Bypass of Highway 11 opened; Highway 522B forms a portion of the former routing.

Highway 524 

Secondary Highway 524, commonly referred to as Highway 524, is a provincially maintained highway in the Canadian province of Ontario.

Highway 526 

Secondary Highway 526, commonly referred to as Highway 526, is a provincially maintained secondary highway in the Canadian province of Ontario. It is a short and lightly travelled route that connects Highway 69 with the community of Britt.

Highway 529 

Secondary Highway 529, commonly referred to as Highway 529, is a secondary highway in the Canadian province of Ontario. Located within Parry Sound District, the highway follows a  route, from its southern terminus at Highway 69 near Pointe au Baril to its northern terminus at Highway 69's crossing of the Magnetawan River near Byng Inlet.

Highway 529A 

Secondary Highway 529A, commonly referred to as Highway 529A, is a provincially maintained secondary highway in the Canadian province of Ontario. Located within Parry Sound District, the highway is a short spur of Highway 529, extending from Manbert to Bayfield Inlet.

Highway 534

Highway 559 

Secondary Highway 559, commonly referred to as Highway 559, is a secondary highway in the Canadian province of Ontario, located within the township of Carling in Parry Sound District. The  highway extends from the entrance to Killbear Provincial Park, near the shores of Georgian Bay, to an interchange with Highway 400 (Exit 247) north of Nobel.

The highway serves as an access road to most of the communities in Carling Township, as well as the current northern terminus of Highway 400 as of 2010.

Highway 592 

Secondary Highway592, commonly referred to as Highway592, is a secondary highway in the Canadian province of Ontario. Located in the Parry Sound District, the highway provides access to Novar, Emsdale, and others. It is the former routing of Highway 11 between Novar and Katrine. Highway592 was assumed by the Department of Highways, predecessor to the modern Ministry of Transportation, on March23, 1961.

Highway 612 

Secondary Highway 612, commonly referred to as Highway 612, is a secondary highway in the Canadian province of Ontario.

At the boundary, the roadway continues southward as Muskoka Road 11 through MacTier. Prior to 1997, this county road was also part of Highway 612.

A previous iteration of Highway612 existed in Algoma District between 1956 and 1958, which was renumbered as Highway 108 in late 1957 and 1958.

Highway 632 

Secondary Highway632, commonly referred to as Highway632, is a secondary highway in the Canadian province of Ontario, located in Parry Sound District. At the boundary, the roadway continues southward as Muskoka Road 7 through the communities of Minett, Gregory and Port Sandfield. Prior to 1997, this county road was also part of Highway 632.

One week later, on July29, another  within what was then just Muskoka District was assumed as part of the highway.

When the District Municipality of Muskoka was created in 1971, secondary highways within its boundaries were transferred to Muskoka and redesignated as part of its county road network.

Highway 644 

Secondary Highway 644 commonly referred to as Highway 644, is a secondary highway in the Canadian province of Ontario. It is a very minor and extremely short route, and holds the distinction of being Ontario's shortest posted highway at only 800 metres (1/2 mile) in length.

It is located in Pointe au Baril in Parry Sound District and simply acts as an access road to the community from Highway 69.

Highway 645 

Secondary Highway 645, commonly referred to as Highway 645, is a secondary highway in the Canadian province of Ontario. The route was established on April1, 1964,
and has remained unchanged since then.

Highway 654 

Secondary Highway 654, commonly referred to as Highway 654, is a secondary highway in the Canadian province of Ontario. The route was designated through North Himsworth on August26, 1964, and through Nipissing on August28,
and has remained unchanged since then, aside from a short extension to the Highway11 Callander Bypass. It is sparsely travelled, but paved throughout its length.

References 

 
Roads in Parry Sound District